Mount Carmel School (New Delhi) is a co-educational independent school for boarding and day students located in Delhi NCR, India with branches at Anand niketan, Dwarka and Gurugram.  Mount Carmel School was founded by  Dr. Vijay Williams and Dr. (Mrs.) Neena Williams in July 1972 with only 12 students. Today the school has over 3000 students with a staff of 150 in 3 branches. The school is affiliated to the Central Board of Secondary Education (CBSE) and run by a registered educational society called Mount Carmel School Society.

Mount Carmel School is a church-based society, registered under the Societies Registration Act, 1860, running Unaided Minority educational institutions in the Nation's capital, New Delhi.

In 2012, school celebrated 40th anniversary of its foundation in Talkatora Stadium where Air chief marshal - Norman Anil Kumar Browne honoured the founding principals Dr V.K. Williams and Dr (Mrs) N.M. Williams. The founder's day event was attended by Foreign Secretary of India Ranjan Mathai and Financial commissioner of National Capital Territory.

A film '40 Glorious Years' was released by Mr. Vineet Joshi - chairman of Central Board of Secondary Education and Vice-chancellor of Allahabad Agricultural University.

Anand Niketan
Mount Carmel School began in Dr. Williams' home in Anand Niketan, New Delhi on 10 July 1972. Operating out of a single room in the household, 12 students were a part of the inaugural year of Mount Carmel School. Today, this branch has nearly 2,500 students, a staff of 150 and two buildings: the Junior School, housing students from nursery to Class III; and the Senior School for Classes IV to Class XII.

The management of the Anand Niketan branch are involved in an adult literacy programme and its students visit Kanak Durga slum dwellers each week.

Dwarka

The branch at Dwarka, Delhi began in 1997, on the occasion of the Silver Jubilee year of the parent school, with 165 students. Now the school has about 3500 students with 300 staff members. The school offers Nursery to Class XII classes and is recognised by the Delhi Administration and affiliated to the Central Board of Secondary Education (CBSE).

College 
Mount Carmel School Society formed the Mount Carmel Business School in  2007 at Dwarka.

Academic excellence 
In terms of academic excellence, a recent school student topped the prestigious Joint Entrance Examination by scoring 100 percentile in 2019. A total of 11,47,125 students appeared for the JEE exam and school performance has been outstanding overall.

Mount Carmel School students have excelled in sports and the school have recently won the gold medal in the 33rd Delhi State Taekwondo Championship. The school secured the second position in the All India Tennis Championship held in Karnal.

Mount Carmel School offers an International student exchange programs with sister schools in Singapore, Wales, Hungary and Indonesia allowing students to experience the lifestyles and cultures from around the world.

Literacy Programme 
In August 2002 the Mount Carmel School took initiative on a 'Right to Education' programme and set up a Shiksha Kendra, an informal learning centre. Teachers of the school camped at the slum clusters located in West Delhi (Lok Sabha constituency) for more than two months and convinced hundreds of parents to send their children to school. Now Mount Carmel Delhi school is providing education, nutrition and healthcare to all these children.

Mount Carmel Delhi encourages students to undertake the responsibility of educating the underprivileged children from class XI as one of its flagship programmes in community service.

Cross country programme 
The school celebrates cultural events in other countries as well in participation with embassies of countries; Students do research and gain knowledge on culture, tradition, political parties, military and government.

References

External links

Catholic schools in India
Christian schools in Delhi
Schools in West Delhi
Educational institutions established in 1972
1972 establishments in Delhi